The Palawan horned frog (Pelobatrachus ligayae) is a species of frog in the family Megophryidae.
It is endemic to the Balabac and Palawan islands, in the Philippines. Its natural habitats are subtropical or tropical dry forests, subtropical or tropical moist lowland forests, subtropical or tropical moist montane forests, subtropical or tropical moist shrubland, rivers, and intermittent rivers.
It is threatened by habitat loss.

Formerly placed in the genus Megophrys, it was reclassified into the genus Pelobatrachus in 2021.

References

Pelobatrachus
Amphibians of the Philippines
Endemic fauna of the Philippines
Fauna of Palawan
Taxonomy articles created by Polbot
Amphibians described in 1920